George W. MacRae (June 24, 1802 – March 6, 1858) was a Florida Supreme Court Justice from January 1, 1847, to January 7, 1848.

On August 24, 1842, MacRae was appointed United States Attorney for the Southern District of Florida by President John Tyler. Two years later, he was elected to the Territorial Senate, representing  South Florida. He was chosen as Senate President as he had no strong party affiliations and was thought to be able to act fairly. In 1846, he was appointed to the Florida Supreme Court, again as an impartial compromise appointee. In 1847, the Whigs gained sufficient control of the legislature to replace the non partisan MacRae with Joseph B. Lancaster.

Macrae then moved to California in 1849, and the following year was an unsuccessful candidate for election to the California Supreme Court. He remained in the state, practicing law in San Francisco, but died in Kentucky while visiting family in that state.

References

Manley, Walter W., Brown, E. Canter and Rise, Eric W.   The Supreme Court of Florida and Its Predecessor Courts, 1821-1917. 127 - 128. University Press of Florida. Gainesville, Florida. 1997. eBook . .

1802 births
1858 deaths
Members of the Florida Territorial Legislature
19th-century American politicians
Justices of the Florida Supreme Court